Glycolipid transfer protein is a protein that in humans is encoded by the GLTP gene.

The protein encoded by this gene is similar to bovine and porcine proteins which accelerate transfer of certain glycosphingolipids and glyceroglycolipids between membranes. It is thought to be a cytoplasmic protein.

References

Further reading